SM U-41 was one of the 329 submarines serving in the Imperial German Navy in World War I. U-41 engaged in naval warfare and took part in the First Battle of the Atlantic.

Design
German Type U 31 submarines were double-hulled ocean-going submarines similar to Type 23 and Type 27 subs in dimensions and differed only slightly in propulsion and speed. They were considered very good high sea boats with average manoeuvrability and good surface steering.

The U-boat was armed with four  torpedo tubes, two fitted in the bow and two in the stern, and carried 6 torpedoes. Additionally U-41 was equipped in 1915 with one  Uk L/30 deck gun.
The boat's complement was 4 officers and 31 enlisted.

Fate
U-41 was sunk by British Q-ship on 24 September 1915 in the Second Baralong Incident.

SS Urbino
After stopping  merchantman Urbino, U-41 sent a boarding party aboard to inspect the cargo.  After finding war material on board, the Germans put the merchant crew off the ship in the lifeboats.  U-41 was in the process of sinking Urbino with gunfire when  (in the guise of the American-flagged merchantman Baralong) arrived on the scene, flying an American flag. When U-41 approached, Wyandra, fired on and sank the U-boat without striking the American flag. This was a violation of the rules of war; while the use of a False Flag was allowed, it was required that a belligerent identify itself before initiating hostilities.

The event generated widespread outrage in Germany, especially among Kriegsmarine officers. The sinking was also commemorated in a propaganda medal designed by the German medallist Karl Goetz.

Summary of raiding history

References

Notes

Citations

Bibliography

External links

Historic England project to research First World War Submarine wrecks 
Howell, D; Croce, P (2014) 'UB-41 and UB 75, off Robin Hood's bay: Marine Geophysical Survey Report', Wessex Archaeology
SS Urbino Wreck Site

World War I submarines of Germany
German Type U 31 submarines
1914 ships
Ships built in Kiel
U-boats commissioned in 1915
Maritime incidents in 1915
U-boats sunk in 1915
U-boats sunk by British warships
World War I shipwrecks in the Atlantic Ocean